"I Confess" can refer to:

I Confess (magazine), a pulp magazine aimed at women published by Dell from 1922 to 1932
I Confess (film), a 1953 film directed by Alfred Hitchcock
"I Confess" (song), by the Beat on the 1982 album Special Beat Service
"I Confess", a 1988 song by the Tom Tom Club featured on the 1988 album Boom Boom Chi Boom Boom
I Confess, a 2004 album by Holly Palmer
Confiteor, a general confession of sin recited at the beginning of Mass of the Roman Rite